CoachRun is a bus operator in the United States that offers inter-city bus services on the East Coast and Florida, including New York, Washington, D.C., Massachusetts, Florida, Maryland, Virginia, North Carolina, South Carolina, and Georgia. The company was founded in 2015 and since 2018 it has added intercity services to 38 destinations.

History 
CoachRun was founded on July 16, 2015 and since 2018 its service has covered U.S. Northeast and West. Between 2018 and 2019, the competition between Boston and New York bus route has been intensified with companies like CoachRun, Catch-a-Ride, and OurBus adding bus trips and other bus companies entering the market place.  According to 2019 DePaul University annual review of the bus travelling industry in the U.S., CoachRun has been listed as one of the operators that offered notable new services in New England.

Apart from the Northeast presence, CoachRun also entered into Florida and Las Vegas markets. But the service between Los Angeles, CA and Las Vegas, NV was temporarily suspended since Jan, 2020.

Bus routes 
CoachRun intercity bus routes connect cities with the following stops. Depending on different date and time, multiple schedules may be included for all mentioned stops.

References

Bus transportation in the United States
Companies based in Boston
Intercity bus companies of the United States
Transport companies established in 2015
Bus transportation in New York City
Bus transportation in Florida
Bus transportation in Washington (state)
Bus transportation in Massachusetts
Bus transportation in North Carolina
Bus transportation in South Carolina
Transportation companies based in Massachusetts